Attorney General Bonner may refer to:

John W. Bonner (1902–1970), Attorney General of Montana
Robert Bonner (politician) (1920–2005), Attorney General of British Columbia